Manuel Delcarmen (born February 16, 1982) is an American former professional baseball pitcher. He previously pitched in Major League Baseball (MLB) from 2005 through 2010, mainly for the Boston Red Sox; he was a member of Boston's 2007 World Series championship team. Delcarmen last played professionally in 2018. He is currently an assistant coach with Fisher College in Boston.

Early life
Delcarmen is a  native of the Hyde Park section of Boston, Massachusetts, and a graduate of West Roxbury High School. He has been called "The Pride of Hyde Park".

MLB career

Boston Red Sox
Delcarmen was a second-round pick by Boston in the 2000 Major League Baseball draft; he was the first draftee from a Boston public high school in 34 years. Beginning the season with the Double-A Portland Sea Dogs, he posted a 4–4 record with three saves and a 3.23 earned run average (ERA) in 31 games. After a promotion to the Triple-A Pawtucket Red Sox, he struck out 12 batters over nine innings with a 3.00 ERA.

Delcarmen's professional career was on the fast track with a mid-90s fastball and a great curveball, until he injured his throwing arm while pitching in a Florida State League game, requiring Tommy John surgery in May 2003. He returned to the mound a year later. Post-surgery, Delcarmen's fastball may have actually gained velocity, as he topped out in the high 90s. Delcarmen had decent control, with a decent changeup and a very good curve which he used as his out pitch.

In 2005, Delcarmen was called up to the major leagues for 10 games. He made his debut with the Red Sox on July 26, 2005. During the regular season, he pitched a total of nine innings with a 3.00 ERA and nine strikeouts.

After starting the 2006 season in Pawtucket, Delcarmen was recalled to the major leagues on April 22. On June 11, Delcarmen got his first major league win, pitching two innings of relief against the Texas Rangers.

Delcarmen was off and on the Boston roster during the 2007 season. He was recalled from Pawtucket on June 17, when relief pitcher Brendan Donnelly was placed on the disabled list. On July 23, Delcarmen finished out a 6–2 Red Sox victory over Cleveland with  innings of scoreless relief, recording his first major league save. He finished the 2007 season with 44 innings in the majors and a 2.05 ERA. In the 2007 playoffs, he had  innings pitched, allowing four earned runs, and was a member of the 2007 World Series championship team.

After an intensive offseason workout regimen, Delcarmen lost . Manager Terry Francona remarked that "he’s lean and he’s looking really good." During the 2008 season, Delcarmen appeared in 73 games for Boston, recording a 1–2 record with two saves, 3.27 ERA, and 72 strikeouts. 

During 2009, Delcarmen's record was 5–2 with 4.53 ERA and 44 strikeouts during 64 games played. He started the 2010 season with Boston, where he appeared in 48 games with a 3–2 record, 4.70 ERA and 32 strikeouts.

Overall, Delcarmen spent parts of six seasons with the Red Sox, appearing in 289 games while compiling an 11–6 record with three saves and 243 strikeouts in  innings pitched.

Colorado Rockies
On August 31, 2010, Delcarmen was traded to Colorado for minor league pitcher Chris Balcom-Miller. Delcarmen appeared in nine games for the Rockies during the 2010 season, pitching  innings while giving up six earned runs (6.48 ERA) and striking out six.

Other MLB organizations
Seattle Mariners
On February 10, 2011, Delcarmen signed a minor league contract with the Seattle Mariners. He was released on June 1.

Texas Rangers
Delcarmen signed a minor league contract with the Texas Rangers on June 2, 2011. He was assigned to the Triple-A Round Rock Express. Delcarmen was released on July 13, after making eight appearances for the Express, posting a 6.75 ERA.

New York Yankees
The New York Yankees signed Delcarmen to a minor league contract on January 30, 2012. He also received an invitation to spring training. He spent the 2012 season with the Triple-A Scranton/Wilkes-Barre Yankees.

Baltimore Orioles
The Baltimore Orioles signed Delcarmen to a minor league contract on January 30, 2013. During the 2013 season, he appeared in 48 games for the Triple-A Norfolk Tides, compiling a 3–3 record with 2.83 ERA.

Washington Nationals
On December 2, 2013, Delcarmen signed a minor league contract, with an invitation to spring training, with the Washington Nationals. During the 2014 and 2015 seasons, he pitched for the Triple-A Syracuse Chiefs. He was released on June 7, 2015.

Non-MLB career

Winter league baseball
Delcarmen pitched for Venados de Mazatlán of the Mexican Pacific League during the 2015–2016 and 2016–2017 winter seasons, and for Tiburones de La Guaira of the Venezuelan Professional Baseball League during the 2017–2018 winter season.

Mexican Baseball League
On April 1, 2016, Delcarmen signed with the Saraperos de Saltillo of the Mexican Baseball League. He was released on April 7, 2016.

Atlantic League of Professional Baseball
On April 4, 2017, Delcarmen signed with the Bridgeport Bluefish of the independent Atlantic League of Professional Baseball. On November 1, 2017, Delcarmen was selected by the New Britain Bees in a dispersal draft of Bridgeport players. On March 20, 2018, he signed with the team for the 2018 season. Delcarmen officially retired from professional baseball after pitching in a game for the Bees on May 31, 2018. He announced that he would be pursuing an opportunity as a studio analyst for the Boston Red Sox.

College baseball coaching
In September 2021, Delcarmen joined the coaching staff of Fisher College in Boston as an assistant baseball coach.

References

External links
, or Retrosheet

1982 births
Living people
American expatriate baseball players in Mexico
Augusta GreenJackets players
Baseball players from Boston
Boston Red Sox players
Bridgeport Bluefish players
Colorado Rockies players
Diablos Rojos del México players
Gulf Coast Red Sox players
Major League Baseball pitchers
Mexican League baseball pitchers
New Britain Bees players
Norfolk Tides players
Pawtucket Red Sox players
Peoria Saguaros players
Portland Sea Dogs players
Round Rock Express players
Saraperos de Saltillo players
Sarasota Red Sox players
Scranton/Wilkes-Barre Yankees players
Syracuse Chiefs players
Tacoma Rainiers players
Tigres del Licey players
American expatriate baseball players in the Dominican Republic
Venados de Mazatlán players
People from Hyde Park, Boston
Fisher Falcons baseball coaches
Baseball coaches from Massachusetts